State Route 267 (SR 267, OH 267) is a north–south state highway located in northeast Ohio, a U.S. state.  Its southern terminus is at a signalized intersection with the duplex of State Route 7 and State Route 39 in downtown East Liverpool, amidst the interchange where State Route 7 and State Route 39 join the U.S. Route 30/State Route 11 freeway in opposing directions.  The northern terminus of State Route 267 is at a diamond interchange with the U.S. Route 30/State Route 7/State Route 11 freeway near Calcutta, one where State Route 7 splits from U.S. Route 30/State Route 11 and takes over for State Route 267 heading north.

Route description
State Route 267's entirety lies within the southeastern corner of Columbiana County.  The highway is not a part of the National Highway System, a network of routes deemed most important for the nation's economy, mobility and defense.

History
State Route 267 made its debut in 1927 along the southeastern Columbiana County alignment that it utilizes to this day.  No changes of major significance have taken place to the route since its debut. A significant portion of SR 267 from its southern terminus in East Liverpool until just before the northern terminus is also part of the historic Lincoln Highway.

Major intersections

References

267
Transportation in Columbiana County, Ohio